Kaygusuz Abdal (1341–1444) was a Turkish folk poet of the 14th century.

Background 

In the 14th century Alaiye was the capital of the small Alaiye beylik (principality). Kaygusuz Abdal was born in or near to Alaiye (modern Alanya, Antalya Province of Turkey). His name was Alaattin Gaybi and Kaygusuz Abdal was his pseudonym. According to tradition he was a bey's son (i.e., prince). But instead of politics he chose to be a dervish. His tutor was Abdal Musa.

Life 
Details of his life and travels are ambiguous. Most of the stories attributed to him are not reliable. His works however convey that he travelled to many places. He travelled to Mecca for Hajj. He also visited Damascus, Najaf and Karbala. There are unreliable accounts of his visits to cities in the Balkans like Yambol, Plovdiv (now both in Bulgaria), Bitola (now in the Republic of Macedonia) and Edirne (now in Turkey). In Egypt he gained the title Abdullah Magaravi ("God's servant living in a cave") after spending several years in seclusion.

Works 
His poetic works include:
 Divan,
 Gülistan,
 Mesnevi-i Baba Kaygusuz (3 Vol.),
 Gevher-nâme,
 Minber-nâme.

His other works are:
 Budala-nâme,
 Kitab-ı Miglate,
 Vücûd nâme.
 Saray-nâme
 Dilgüşâ.

References 

1341 births
Turkish-language poets
Anatolian beyliks
Year of death unknown
Antalya Province
Alanya District
14th-century poets